The Tucke Monument is a  obelisk gravestone monument erected in 1914 to honor Reverend John Tucke (1702–1773).  The monument is located on Star Island, New Hampshire, where Tucke was a minister, judge, educator, physician, and in his probate record, "owner" of a 12-year old black girl by the name of Diana, valued at 20 pounds.

The Tucke Monument is the tallest gravestone in the state of New Hampshire, far surpassing the  gravestone of Frank Jones located in Portsmouth.

History 
Philanthropist Edward Tuck, the namesake of Dartmouth's business school, financed the monument's construction in 1914, in cooperation with the New Hampshire Historical Society.  On July 29, 1914, the Historical Society organized a dedication for the monument, and published a 68-page book, memorializing the event:

It was a beautiful day, and a fresh breeze blew all the clouds inland.  The steamer Nassau from Boston, specially chartered for the occasion, left Jones's wharf at ten o'clock, making the trip in an hour.  Arriving at Star Island the company proceeded to the monument, which stands a short distance southeast of the quaint little stone church where candle-light services are still held as in days of yore.  Everyone was impressed by the dignity and beauty of the obelisk, which stands forty-six and one-half feet high, and can be seen from ten miles out at sea.  The shaft tapers in the same proportions as the monument at Bunker Hill.

An inscription at the base of the Tucke Monument reads:

See also 
Monument for Captain John Smith

References 

Buildings and structures completed in 1914
Buildings and structures in Rockingham County, New Hampshire
Monuments and memorials in New Hampshire
Obelisks in the United States